Maskiri, born Alishias Musimbe on 6 April 1982 is a Zimbabwean rapper.

Early background
He was born in Chitungwiza, a residential town about 25 km out of Harare, where he grew up and attended Chemhanza Secondary School until being expelled for truancy and bullying other students. He was then enrolled in St. Aiden's Primary School in Chitungwiza but refused to continue, saying St. Aiden's was just dull.

Maskiri raps in Shona. He is supposedly known by some as Africa's Eminem and has recently performed the song "Africa" with English pop artist Keisha White. This is one of the few songs performed by African musicians in collaboration with international musicians.

Music videos
On Saturday 27 November 2010, Maskiri alongside fellow artist Nox Guni went on set to shoot visuals for "Wenera", Maskiri's first-ever music video which became top ZBC video of the year and won a NAMA. The video was directed by Chagwa Black and was shot on location in Pretoria, South Africa.

References

External links
 Maskiri returns with a bang The Standard extract 18 March 2019, retrieved 10 November 2019
 Intimacy with Zim musicians   16 September 2011, retrieved 10 November 2019

Living people
Zimbabwean rappers
1980 births